(formerly the bill ), a United States public law, that is entitled "to amend the Interstate Land Sales Full Disclosure Act to clarify how the Act applies to condominiums," is a bill that was introduced into the United States House of Representatives during the 113th United States Congress.  The Interstate Land Sales Full Disclosure Act of 1968 was passed in 1968 with the intention of helping protect consumers from land-related scams, but regulating the sale of land across state lines.  The act requires sellers to prepare center information about the piece of property they are trying to sell and disclose it in a "Property Report."  The law was originally administered by the United States Department of Housing and Urban Development, but is currently run by the Consumer Financial Protection Bureau.  H.R. 2600 would make changes to this law related to condominiums.

Provisions of the bill
This summary is based largely on the summary provided by the Congressional Research Service, a public domain source.

H.R. 2600 would amend the Interstate Land Sales Full Disclosure Act to exempt from certain registration and disclosure requirements the sale or lease of a condominium unit not already exempt from coverage under such Act.

Procedural history
H.R. 2600 was introduced into the House on June 28, 2013 by Rep. Carolyn B. Maloney (D, NY-12).  It was referred to the United States House Committee on Financial Services.  On September 20, 2013, House Majority Leader Eric Cantor announced that H.R. 1961 would be on the legislative schedule for the week of September 23.  It was scheduled to be considered under a suspension of the rules on September 25, 2013. On September 27, 2013, on the verge of a government shutdown by Republicans, the House of Representatives passed H.R. 2600 by a vote of 410–0.  The bill would provide an exemption for condominiums from ILSA's registration requirements and would apply to all new constructions after enactment. On September 18, 2014, the United States Senate voted to pass the bill with unanimous consent. On September 26, 2014, President Barack Obama signed the bill and it became .

See also
List of bills in the 113th United States Congress
Interstate Land Sales Full Disclosure Act of 1968

Notes/References

External links

Library of Congress - Thomas H.R. 2600
beta.congress.gov H.R. 2600
GovTrack.us H.R. 2600
OpenCongress.org H.R. 2600
WashingtonWatch.com H.R. 2600

Acts of the 113th United States Congress
United States federal housing legislation
Real property law in the United States